"Devil's Planet" is the twenty-second episode of the second series of the British sci-fi television series Space: 1999 (and the forty-sixth overall episode of the programme).  The screenplay was written by Michael Winder; the director was Tom Clegg.  The original title of the episode was "Devil's Moon".  The final shooting script is dated 9 September 1976 and live-action filming began on Monday 1 November 1976 lasting through to Thursday 18 November 1976. The episode was first broadcast in the U.K. on 1 September 1977.

Story 
2306 days after leaving Earth orbit, the Moon is passing a solar system containing a pair of potentially habitable planets.  John Koenig takes Eagle One on a reconnaissance flight with co-pilot Blake Maine. A sensor sweep of the larger world reveals a breathable atmosphere, vegetation, a city, but no life-signs except a single person. After landing, the two men follow the life reading, which ceases as abruptly as it appeared.  They find a freestanding booth surrounded by dozens of corpses.  Scanning the bodies suggests a neurological pathogen that the Alphans must be immune to. The investigation is interrupted when a shimmering light emanates from the booth.  A man materialises and exits, then keels over and dies.  Koenig and Maine depart.  Flying over the city, they see corpses lying everywhere.  Scans of the other planet reveal identical atmosphere and botanical life.  While making a close pass, the Eagle blunders into a force-field.  Koenig manages a quick mayday call to Alpha before they crash-land in a forest. They survive but then see a running man being hunted by a group of whip-wielding women. As the man tries to reach a sculptural column, the women corner him just short of his goal.  When Koenig and Maine move to assist him, Maine runs into an invisible energy barrier and is vaporised, leaving just a smouldering uniform. Koenig is set upon by one of the women and clubbed unconscious with the hilt of her whip.

This planet, Entra, is a prison for political dissidents sent from the other world, Ellna. The prison is run entirely by women and the inmates are all male. As the huntress-guards carry Koenig to their headquarters, a trial is underway there in a large hall.  A prisoner stands accused of plotting an uprising against the ruling authority.  Beside him stands Crael, a senior prisoner, pleading his case to Elizia, mistress-governor of this penal colony.  But this is simply a kangaroo court, and she declares the accused to be guilty. The proceedings are interrupted by the senior guard, Sares, who reports on the capture of Koenig.  She presents Koenig's stun-gun to Elizia, who uses it to stun the defendant. He is then sentenced to 'The Hunt'.  Crael denounces 'The Hunt' as inhuman, as few survive.  Elizia decrees that any prisoner offered the chance to outwit the Hunters and reach the 'Sanctuary Column'—winning instant parole and a return to Ellna—will accept the challenge.

Elizia goes to observe Koenig's interrogation by her Head of Security. Using a mind-probe, she discovers Koenig knows about the plague on Ellna—a secret known only to herself and Elizia.  Elizia has withheld all knowledge of the disaster from both prisoners and guards in order to maintain the status-quo on Entra. She orders the information removed from Koenig's brain, regardless of any brain damage this may cause.

She then rejoins Crael to grant an early parole to another inmate.  After the transbeamer conveys the man home (and to his death), Crael questions why the government has stopped sending new prisoners to Entra.  The inmates are also unhappy with the recent rules banning live contact with Ellna, but Elizia responds with plausible lies.  When he criticises her cruel policies, a guard lashes him for impertinence.  Elizia smirks, stating he is lucky he amuses her.

The Interrogator informs Elizia the alien anatomy of Koenig's brain is preventing her from erasing their secret. The Interrogator discusses the growing unrest among the prisoners and advises telling the truth about the plague.  Elizia refuses, knowing the inmates would become ungovernable.  The Interrogator predicts Koenig will tell them but Elizia is confident no one will believe him.

Koenig awakens in a cell with three Entran prisoners.  As expected, he soon reveals his knowledge of the mass death on Ellna.  The convicts wonder if this is the truth or another of Elizia's mind games.  Just then, the 'weekly news' from Ellna is played over the public-address system.  Fabricated by Elizia, this broadcast is the only mode of information available to the prisoners.  As an announcer recounts false news of friends and family, the angry prisoners attack Koenig for lying but he is saved by the guards.

Elizia openly ogles Koenig like a male sex object.  She invites him to stay with her and experience "undreamed-of pleasure"...until she tires of him.  After Koenig refuses her crass offer, they are interrupted by the arrival of Eagle Two in orbit.  Koenig is held in a sound-proof force-field as Elizia contacts the ship.  She attempts to warn them off, but pilots Fraser and Alibe are determined to rescue their Alphan colleagues.  To deter them, Elizia lies, saying both men were killed in the crash.  Despite the threat of the force field, Fraser declares he will come in shooting, if necessary, in order to recover the bodies. Elizia craftily changes tactics, granting permission to land.  She directs Crael to lead a work-party to the clearing near the crash site.  By the time the Alphans arrive, all they will find is evidence of two deaths.  While Koenig's footprints are swept away, another inmate, Phirly, dons Koenig's uniform.  He is instructed to leave a trail, walk up to the deactivated energy fence, and strip. Phirly does as he is told, but Elizia reactivates the fence early, vaporising him so that she can make it appear that Koenig died there.

Koenig watches from his cell window as Eagle Two touches down.  Elizia greets the Alphan party and they proceed to the crash site.  Elizia feigns sympathy as she relates her version of the tragedy—the two men, having survived the crash, blundered into a boundary fence before help could arrive.  Fraser and Alibe are shown the staged footprints and two piles of charred Alphan uniforms.  The grieving Alphans then depart, much to Elizia's satisfaction.

Koenig is brought to the reception hall where an enticingly-gowned Elizia awaits.  A hunter at heart, she finds the thrill of seduction in the chase as well as the conquest. In the face of his defiance, she reminds him that his people believe him dead.  Remaining alive depends on how much he entertains her.  Koenig seems to capitulate, taking her in his arms and kissing her—then sends her tumbling into her personal guards before escaping into the forest outside.

Elizia instructs her guards that as Koenig has shown contempt for their culture and authority, he must die slowly when captured.  While the guards begin tracking him, Koenig comes across the wreckage of Eagle One and attempts to contact Alpha. Elizia smirks; while no transmission can penetrate the defence shield, it has pinpointed his location. As Elizia and company board the ship, he salvages a homing transmitter and a fire extinguisher before jumping down the command-module escape hatch.  Three guards soon overtake him, but Koenig incapacitates them with the extinguisher.  As he activates the transmitter, Sares grabs him, boasting their shield is blocking his signal. Koenig escapes her and, with this new information, he changes tactics and heads back to the prison tower.  Koenig enters the hall and, before anyone can prevent him, darts into the transbeam booth.  Elizia raises a weapon, threatening to disintegrate him.  Koenig cagily reminds everyone that if she shoots, she destroys the transbeamer—and their only means of returning home.  The Interrogator reminds Elizia that, with no hope of parole, the prisoners will revolt.  Crael addresses Koenig regarding his claim of a plague-ravaged Ellna.  Koenig tells them Elizia has known about it all along and has been lying to them all.  A verbal battle of wits ensues, with Koenig and Elizia each challenging the other's veracity.  Upon engaging the transbeamer, Koenig issues her a final challenge to follow him herself and bring him back alive.

On Ellna, Koenig activates the homing device, which is received by Eagle Two.  On Entra, Elizia faces defeat.  The Interrogator will no longer support her lies and the guards' loyalty is broken.  She transports herself to Ellna, emboldened by the fact that she will at least kill Koenig before her own death, but she dies within moments of arriving. Eagle Two arrives and Koenig is rescued.

Cast

Starring 
 Martin Landau — Commander John Koenig
 Barbara Bain — Doctor Helena Russell

Also starring 
 Catherine Schell — Maya

Featuring 
 Tony Anholt — Tony Verdeschi

Guest stars 
 Hildegarde Neil — Elizia
 Roy Marsden — Crael

Also featuring 
 Dora Reisser — The Interrogator
 Cassandra Harris — Controller Sares
 Angus MacInnes — Jelto
 Arthur White — Kinano
 Michael Dickinson — Blake Maine
 John Hug — Astronaut Bill Fraser
 Alibe Parsons — Alibe
 Sam Dastor — Doctor Ed Spencer

Uncredited artists 
 Geoffrey Greenhill — Phirly
 Peter Brayham — Garth
 Robert Reeves — Peter
 Del Baker — Hunted Prisoner
 Alan Harris — Accused Prisoner

Music 

The score was re-edited from previous Space: 1999 incidental music tracks composed for the second series by Derek Wadsworth and draws primarily from the scores of "The Metamorph" and "The Exiles".

Production notes 

 With a plot derived from The Most Dangerous Game, set in an alien prison reminiscent of Devil's Island, and showcasing a bevy of catsuited, whip-wielding dominatrices, "Devil's Planet" is the last of the 'Koenig Double-Up' scripts.  The episode is unique in that it was intentionally crafted to feature Martin Landau alone.  Barbara Bain, Catherine Schell and Tony Anholt, though receiving on-screen credit, would appear only in library footage seen during Koenig's mind-probe; Bain would also be heard narrating Helena's customary status report at the start of the episode.  At the time of filming, Bain, Schell, Anholt and Nick Tate were off filming the opposing double-up episode "Dorzak".
 Entitled "Devil's Moon" until post-production, the story would undergo other adjustments: (1) The Alphans were to have received a distress signal from Ellna; this was the reason Koenig was flying with a member of the medical rescue team; (2)  Significant dialogue between Elizia and Crael was cut.  It was inferred that Crael had served his sentence, but remained out of a sense of duty to act as defence counsel for the inmates.  More dialogue about the rights of the imprisoned was also excised; (3) A sequence in the security ward was removed where, faced with Fraser's threat of attack, the Entrans view Koenig's knowledge of Earth warfare.  Library footage would have depicted the history of war from marching Roman legions to the Hiroshima atomic bomb
 The supporting cast was to include Bill Fraser, Doctor Ben Vincent and Sandra Benes.  While John Hug would appear as Fraser, Jeffery Kissoon was no longer available and his role was given to newcomer Sam Dastor, playing Doctor Ed Spencer.  Sahn was also replaced, as Zienia Merton was committed to a lead part in the Norwegian film Kosmetikkrevolusjonen.  She had intended staying long enough to film this episode, excited that her character would leave the confines of Moonbase.  However, delays in the Space: 1999 shooting schedule further pushed back the starting date and Merton was forced to depart for Norway.  The role would be given to American actress Alibe Parsons. Her character, also called Alibe, is a communications officer and would be given all of the Sandra Benes scenes and dialogue for the rest of the series.

Novelisation 

The episode was adapted in the fifth Year Two Space: 1999 novel The Time Fighters by Michael Butterworth published in 1977.  Few changes were made to this narrative when the author chose to blend this story with "The Séance Spectre".  Koenig and Maine were scouting ahead of the Moon after its emergence from a space warp.  As the ship went down, they observed 'Sandor' and his mutineers overrunning Command Centre.  Elizia was portrayed as more psychotically sadistic, wanting to fashion Koenig's skin into a whip after he rejects her.

In the reworked omnibus Space: 1999—Year Two, the absence of Helena, Maya, Verdeschi and Carter is rationalised by placing them out of communications range on the Eagle fleet housing the Alphans while repair crews tend to the damage done to Alpha by the waste-pit detonation in "The Séance Spectre".

References

External links 
Space: 1999 - "Devil's Planet" - The Catacombs episode guide
Space: 1999 - "Devil's Planet" - Moonbase Alpha's Space: 1999 page

1977 British television episodes
Space: 1999 episodes